Garmkhan District is a district (bakhsh) in Bojnord County, North Khorasan Province, Iran. At the 2006 census, its population was 28,259, in 6,676 families.  The District has one city: Hesar-e Garmkhan.  The District has two rural districts (dehestan): Garmkhan Rural District and Gifan Rural District.

References 

Districts of North Khorasan Province
Bojnord County